The 2008–09 Lebanese Second Division was the 75th season of the second-highest level of Soccer in Lebanon. This season once again featured 14 Clubs just like the season before.

Overview
In the 2007–08 Premier League, both Al-Irshad(finished 11th) and Al-Ahli Sidon (finished last) were relegated. They joined the Second Division along with Al-Riyadah and Al-Khoyol who were promoted to the Second Division from the Third Division in the 2007–08 season. Unlike the previous 3 seasons, no clubs pulled out before the season even started, a bonus for the league.

The 2-Group Round-Robin format was once again used in order to determine the 4 clubs to qualify for the promotion play-off group. The winner of the group would be automatically promoted to the Premier League for the 2009–10 Season. The runners-up would also be promoted to the Premier League.

Table

Group A

Group B

Top scorers

Promotion and Relegation

Promotion to the Premier League 
TBA
TBA

Relegation to the Third Division
TBA
TBA

References

External links
Goalzz.com - Lebanese Main Page
RSSSF.com - 2008/09 Lebanese Competitions

Lebanese Second Division seasons
Leb
2008–09 in Lebanese football